Southern Military Region is one of the five military regions of the Egyptian armed forces.  it is headquartered in Assiut.

Structure 

The Southern Military Region is the smallest military region of the four, as it only consists of three Mechanized Infantry Brigades, two Engineer Brigades and one medium range Artillery Brigade.

 116th Mechanized Brigade (Assiut) 
 117th Mechanized Brigade (Assiut) 
 305th Mechanized Brigade (Aswan)

References

External links
http://www.arabstoday.net/en/news/arabworld/Egypt%20lauds%20role%20of%20southern%20military%20region%20in%20defending%20homeland.html

Military regions of Egypt